Christl Franziska Antonia Cranz-Borchers (1 July 1914 – 28 September 2004) was a German alpine ski racer. Cranz dominated international competition in the 1930s, winning twelve world championship titles between 1934 and 1939. At the 1936 Winter Olympics in Garmisch-Partenkirchen, she won the combined competition (slalom and downhill).

Biography
Born in Brussels, Cranz was the older sister of Rudolf Cranz. After the break-out of World War I, Cranz and her family fled from Belgium to Traifelberg near Reutlingen, where Cranz learned to ski. Afterwards the family moved to Grindelwald and Freiburg.

Alongside her apprenticeship as trainer and philologist she started a successful ski racing career. In 1934, she won all titles at the German Championship. At the world championship in St. Moritz she won the slalom and the combined competition and was second in downhill (after Swiss Anny Rüegg). She won all titles at the world championships in 1937 (Chamonix) and 1939 (Zakopane). To this day, Cranz remains the most successful competitor at the World Championships, with twelve gold and three silver medals. In the 1930s, the championships were held annually.

At the 1936 Winter Olympics, Cranz won the newly established alpine combined competition in a spectacular race. After a crash in the downhill competition Cranz was 19 seconds behind Laila Schou Nilsen (Norway), but after two outstanding slalom races she won the combined ahead of  Käthe Grasegger (Germany) and Schou Nilsen.

At the 1941 World Championships in Cortina d'Ampezzo, Cranz won two additional titles and then retired. Taking place during World War II with only Germany-friendly athletes, the championship was not acknowledged by the International Ski Federation. After her active career, Cranz publicly donated her skis and equipment, meticulously exploited by the NS-propaganda, for the "Winterhilfswerk" to support the Nazi-German troops and aggression against the Soviet Union.

In 1943, Cranz married Adolf Borchers. After the end of the war she was arrested because of her collaboration with the Nazis and was forced to do farmwork for eleven months. Cranz fled into the American Occupation Zone in 1947. Later she founded a skiing school with her husband, which she led until 1987. Cranz was inducted into the Hall of Fame of International Women's Sports in New York.

References

External links

Christl Cranz, Alpine skiing’s first Olympic gold medallist at Olympic.org

Obituary

1914 births
2004 deaths
20th-century German people
German female alpine skiers
Olympic gold medalists for Germany
Olympic alpine skiers of Germany
Alpine skiers at the 1936 Winter Olympics
German expatriate sportspeople in Belgium
Sportspeople from Brussels
Olympic medalists in alpine skiing
Medalists at the 1936 Winter Olympics
20th-century German women